Chrząstowice  (German: Chronstau) is a village in Opole County, Opole Voivodeship, in south-western Poland. It is the seat of the gmina (administrative district) called Gmina Chrząstowice, which has been officially bilingual in Polish and German since 2006. 

The village has a population of 1,200.

References

Villages in Opole County